The Sabarmati river  is one of the major west-flowing rivers in India. It originates in the Aravalli Range of the Udaipur District of Rajasthan and meets the Gulf of Khambhat of Arabian Sea after travelling  in a south-westerly direction across Rajasthan and Gujarat.  of the river length is in Rajasthan, while  is in Gujarat.

Course 
The Sabarmati River originates in the Aravalli hills in the Indian state of Rajasthan. After travelling  in Rajasthan it flows into the Indian state of Gujarat where it is joined by a left bank tributary, Wakal, near the village Ghonpankhari. From there, the river continues southwest to Mhauri and meets a right bank tributary, the Sei River. Continuing its journey, it is joined by a left bank tributary, the Harnav River, before entering the Dharoi reservoir. After the Sabarmati passes the Dharoi dam it meets another left bank tributary, the Hathmati River. From there, the river flows past the city of Ahmedabad and is joined by a left bank tributary, the Watrak River. The Sabarmati River continues to flow and drains into the Gulf of Khambhat, in the Arabian Sea.

Basin
The catchment area of the Sabarmati basin is  out of which  lies in Rajasthan State and the remaining  in Gujarat. The river traverses three geomorphic zones: rocky uplands, middle alluvial plains, and lower estuarine zone.

The major tributaries are the Watrak, Wakal, Hathmati, Harnav, and Sei rivers.

The Sabarmati is a seasonal river whose flows are dominated by the monsoon, with little or no flows post-monsoon.

Religious significance 
In Rajasthan, it is believed that the Sabarmati River originated due to the penance of ascetic Kashyapa on Mount Abu. His penance had pleased Shiva and in return, Shiva gave ascetic Kashyapa the Ganges River. The Ganges River flowed from Shiva's hair onto Mount Abu and became the Sabarmati River. In another legend surrounding the origin of the river, Shiva brought the goddess Ganga to Gujarat and that caused the Sabarmati to come into being.

History
Rajashekhara's Kavya-mimamsa (10th century) calls the river Shvabhravati (IAST: Śvabhravatī). The 11th century text Shringara-manjari-katha calls it "Sambhramavati" (literally, "full of fickleness").

Jain Acharya Buddhisagarsuri has written many poems about the Sabarmati river.

During India's independence struggle, Mahatma Gandhi established the Sabarmati Ashram as his home on the banks of this river.

In 2018, an assessment by the Central Pollution Control Board (CPCB) named the Kheroj-Vautha stretch of the Sabarmati among the most polluted river stretches in India.

Dams
There are several reservoirs on Sabarmati and its tributaries. The Dharoi dam is located on the main river. Hathmati, Harnav and Guhai dams are located on the tributaries meeting the main river upstream of Ahmedabad while Meshvo reservoir, Meshvo pick-up weir, Mazam and Watrak dams are located on tributaries meeting downstream. The Kalpasar is planned project in the Gulf of Khambhat.

Sabarmati Riverfront
The Sabarmati Riverfront project is one of the most ambitious project undertaken by the government to enrich the economy. As per the research conducted by couple of academicians, the main concern of the riverfront project was to reduce the river pollution, increase tourism, and prevent future floods. The second phase of the project has now received an in-principle approval.

Gallery

See also
Ahmedabad
List of rivers in India
Sabarmati Ashram

References

External links

Sabarmati Basin (Department of Irrigation, Government of Rajasthan)
Sustainable water project Sabarmati River Basin
Map of Sabarmati Basin
Integrated management of the Sabarmati river basin
Information about sabarmati riverfront project of Ahmedabad

Rivers of Rajasthan
Rivers of Gujarat
Geography of Ahmedabad
Rivers of India